The northern New Guinea tree frog (Nyctimystes gramineus) is a species of frog in the subfamily Pelodryadinae. It is endemic to Papua New Guinea. Its natural habitats are subtropical or tropical moist lowland forests and subtropical or tropical moist montane forests. It is threatened by habitat loss.

References

Nyctimystes
Amphibians of Papua New Guinea
Taxonomy articles created by Polbot
Amphibians described in 1905
Taxobox binomials not recognized by IUCN